Motormouth (Harley Davis) is a fictional character created by Paul Neary and developed by writer Graham Marks with initial designs by Gary Frank (Supreme Power, The Incredible Hulk). As the title character of her own series, Motormouth (later Motormouth & Killpower) was part of a line of original comics released in the early-to-mid 1990s by Marvel UK. She is a teenage street-rat from London, England, with a fierce temper who curses constantly. She is 5 ft 4 in (1.62 m) tall and weighs roughly 7 st 7 lb / .

Publication history
Motormouth ran for 12 issues, with Harley and later her partner Killpower going to various alternative realities from the regular Marvel Universe.

Fictional character biography
Harley is orphaned at age 11 and grows up as part of a gang that lives in the East End of London. They survive by foraging and stealing. Her incredibly foul language earns her the nickname "Motormouth". When she is 17, Harley is discovered by Laarson, an agent of Mys-Tech, the shadowy organisation that is featured in all of Marvel UK's 1990s titles. Harley is a candidate for his MOPED (Mind Operated PErsonal Dematerialisation) technology. This allows people to jump between alternative realities but will only operate on people with certain strands of DNA. The unit is disguised as a pair of training shoes, which Harley finds and tries on. At the same time, Laarson is being executed by Mys-Tech's Techno-Wizards, and agents are sent to find the MOPED units. In order to save her and the units, Laarson's subordinates activate the technology and send her to another universe.

While still on the run from Mys-Tech, Harley is sent to a future in which the world is covered in shopping malls. It is here she purchases a Soni-Muta 500 Unit, a microchip that allows her to mentally tune in to any radio station she wanted. This would later give her a sonic scream. Harley returns to her own universe and is captured and put to work by Mys-Tech. She escapes after a mission to Tokyo, Japan.

Killpower
She has to make a random jump in order to escape and ends up on a planet named Tekron. Killpower, an agent of Mys-Tech, is sent to find her. Unable to escape him, Harley reasons with the man instead. Mentally little more than a small child, Killpower becomes intrigued by Harley and joins her as her partner. Harley is then badly injured on Tekron when a stray bullet hits her in the throat. Killpower uses her Soni-Muta 500 and the MOPED technology to cure her. This not only gives her the aforementioned sonic scream, but she could also now travel between universes without the aid of technology. Both are then forced to flee from Mys-Tech's influence.

Motormouth and Killpower then appear in the Battletide mini-series. Death's Head is hired by Mys-Tech to retrieve Killpower. While the two fight, Motormouth and Tuck (Death's Head partner) go on a shopping spree on an alien planet. Motormouth and Killpower later plan an attack on Tyburn, a powerful Mys-Tech agent. Harley is able to steal their MOPED unit and neutralize the tracking devices Mys-Tech had implanted in the duo. Tyburn survives the attack.

Saving the world
Motormouth becomes an essential part of the Mys-Tech Wars mini-series. At first, she is just one of many superheroes attacking the main Mys-Tech complex, hoping to take down the Techno-Wizards, the heads of Mys-Tech.

The wizards fight back successfully, slaughtering most of the heroes. Death-Head kills them in return. Unfortunately, this endangers all of Earth. A fortunate fall from Killpower allows six heroes, Motormouth included, to break free of the melee and patch themselves into the required equipment so they can save the Earth from destruction. The others, such as Doctor Strange and Professor X, bring powerful forces to the mix. Motormouth ends up simply sitting in the sixth chair to fill out the required number of entities.

The Earth is saved and time is reversed, undoing all the deaths that have occurred. Only the last six remember any of which had happened.

Time Guardian and the Hulk
In the Dark Guard mini-series, both Motormouth and Killpower are recruited by the Time Guardian to help stop a war on the planet Eopia. The war had been caused by Tyburn, and Mys-Tech agents have infiltrated both sides of the war. Motormouth is instrumental in stopping a powerful Mys-Tech agent called Collapsar, who had captured Killpower. Her extra-sensory vision allows her to see microfractures in his torso which in turn allows Death's Head to smash him.

Motormouth and Killpower guest-starred in an issue of Incredible Hulk, illustrated by Motormouth's co-creator Gary Frank. The Hulk literally falls onto their dinner table. This is after the Hulk fights the villain Madman. Killpower and Hulk briefly fight. The Hulk proves himself more than a match for her obscene language. The trio team up to rescue Prince Charles from Madman, who had taken him up the side of Big Ben. Though he is dropped off the side, Charles escapes injury. In the ensuing battle, Harley accidentally brings down London Bridge and Madman escapes.

Motormouth and Killpower come under the attention of Nigel Orpington-Smythe, leader of the R.C.X. a British Intelligence Agency from the comic book Excalibur. Security footage stills of the two are shown to Captain Britain as an example of the lawless vigilantism that Smythe seeks to control. R.C.X is neutralized before they became a threat to Harley.

Issue #12, the last of the series, features Motormouth visiting a homeless encampment on the South Side of the River Thames in London, England. It's revealed she used to live there, though she did not enjoy it. The two heroes, along with Death's Head, defeat and kill a murderous A.I.M. construct that has taken on the mannerisms of the local homeless population. The second part of the issue features the two battling fanatical, naive worshippers of a lost alien being. In defeating the being, Killpower becomes the world's new god.

Post-series appearances
Two new stories were planned before Marvel UK fell. Motormouth versus Removal Man was partially drawn and had her fighting a Mys-Tech assassin who made his targets never exist in the first place (boasting one of his finest jobs was the Fantastic Five). Motormouth Remix would have had her hopping through alternate realities looking for Killpower and running into versions of Marvel US characters, to connect Marvel UK more to their parent company.

Harley has since had a cameo appearance in the Avengers Forever mini-series.

Sometime later, she becomes a reserve agent for MI:13. While trying to rescue Faiza Hussain's parents, she is hospitalised.

When Mys-Tech tried to send all of Britain to Hell, Motormouth and Killpower fought at the Battle of London Bridge. She was also sucked into Hell but Killpower saved her and the other heroes, leaving himself trapped in the inferno. Harley was left depressed and quit MI:13, living instead on a council estate in London, where she was known for her work fighting the vampire invasion. She became the single mother to two children, Victoria and Albert (named after pubs), and every so often she'd be attacked by (and kill) a former Mys-Tech monster who thought she was an easy target. After one attack, she learned her children were psychic mutants who were removing her memories of the monsters to stop her from being sad.

She temporarily rejoined MI:13 
and led an army of British heroes to the Shard to fight an invasion from Hell. To Harley's shock, it turned out Hell's leader was a transformed Killpower, who had been manipulated by Mephisto into believing she'd abandoned him. Killpower tried to kill her but her sonic scream managed to clear his mind; realising he'd been made into "a bad man", he allowed Britain's super-soldiers to kill him. A distraught Harley was approached by Nick Fury to join SHIELD (and angrily chewed him out).

Other versions
A future version of Harley appears in Excalibur #67 (July 1993). Working with other heroes to protect an enclave of innocent people, she steps up to battle a wave of Sentinels. Both sides inflict heavy casualties. Harley is one of the many disintegrated by the robot's weapons.

Powers and abilities

Harley can create deafening sounds and force blasts by screaming or shouting, similar to the X-Men's Banshee or DC Comics' Black Canary. By humming at a high pitch, she can use ultrasound to see through solid objects. She can also jump between alternate universes using the MOPED technology built into her. This technology also allows her to sense threats outside her normal field or range of senses. She also seems to have some ability to sense various forms of energy.

Notes

References

Motormouth at the Appendix to the Handbook of the Marvel Universe
Motormouth at the International Catalogue of Superheroes

Motormouth at the Big Comic Book DataBase

1992 comics debuts
Comics characters introduced in 1992
Fictional characters who can manipulate sound
Marvel Comics cyborgs
Marvel Comics characters who can teleport
Marvel Comics mutates
Marvel UK characters
Marvel UK titles
Marvel Comics female superheroes